The Sanaksar Monastery of the Nativity of the Mother of God is located in the Russian Federation, in the Temnikov district of Republic Mordovia.

The monastery was founded in 1659. It was returned to the Russian Orthodox church in 1991.

The relics of the patron of the Russian Navy and of the Russian nuclear-armed strategic bombers, Admiral Fyodor Ushakov is enshrined in the monastery.

External links

   

Buildings and structures in Mordovia
Russian Orthodox monasteries in Russia
Objects of cultural heritage of Russia of federal significance
Cultural heritage monuments in Mordovia